Paul Slade Thoms (February 19, 1932 – July 4, 2012) was a land surveyor and politician in Newfoundland. He represented Bonavista North from 1971 to 1975 in the Newfoundland House of Assembly.

The son of James Ernest Thoms and Gertrude Helen Bridger, he was born in Garnish and was educated in Middle Brook. Thoms married Elsie Barrow. He served in the Royal Canadian Air Force from 1949 to 1954. Thoms was president of the Gambo Red Cross. From 1967 to 1972, he owned and operated a farm in partnership with his brother Jim.

Thoms was ordained an Anglican deacon in 1991 and became a priest in 1992. He was also a member of the Orange Order in Newfoundland.

References 

1932 births
2012 deaths
Liberal Party of Newfoundland and Labrador MHAs
Canadian Anglican priests